The Pascack Valley is the name for a region of New Jersey, United States, contained within Bergen County.  It is named for the Pascack Brook. The region consists of eight municipalities: Montvale, Park Ridge, Woodcliff Lake, Hillsdale, Westwood, River Vale, Washington Township, and Emerson.

Entities named after the valley
 Pascack Valley Regional High School District serving students from Hillsdale, Montvale, River Vale and Woodcliff Lake. It operates two schools:
 Pascack Valley High School, Hillsdale
 Pascack Hills High School, Montvale
 Pascack Valley Line, operated by New Jersey Transit, offers service to Hoboken, New Jersey, and to New York City via the Secaucus Junction
 Pascack Valley Hospital, former hospital in Westwood, now re-opened as the Hackensack University Medical Center at Pascack Valley
 Hackensack University Medical Center at Pascack Valley, Westwood
Pascack Valley Community Life, weekly newspaper
 Greater Pascack Valley Chamber of Commerce website
 Pascack Historical Society , Park Ridge

See also
 The Pascack Valley Line: A History of the New Jersey and New York Railroad

References

External links
 Historical Background of the Pascack Valley Area of Bergen County
 Overview of Pascack Valley Towns
 Pascack Valley Line History
 Pascack Valley Regional High School District
 Greater Pascack Valley Chamber of Commerce website
 Pascack Historical Society 

 
Geography of Bergen County, New Jersey
Regions of New Jersey
Valleys of New Jersey